Nora Kelly was a New Zealand-born Australian journalist, poet and playwright, who wrote as Nora McAuliffe. She also wrote as John Egan and Flossy Fluffytop. She wrote the "Women's Letter" in The Bulletin for fifteen years.

Biography 
Kelly was born in Dunedin, New Zealand and educated at St Dominic's College. Her career in journalism began by writing "The Dunedin Letter" for the Christchurch Sun and she began contributing poetry and short stories to The Lone Hand. 

She moved to Sydney, Australia and was employed by The Bulletin in 1917, which also published some of her war poetry. She took over writing its "Women's Letter" in 1919 from Margaret Cox-Taylor who wrote as Vandorian.  She fulfilled that role until 1934, when she left for England. She remained its social editor until at least 1950. 

Kelly was a founding member of the Society of Women Writers and served as president in 1941–43. 

The first play she wrote was Love, performed by the Sydney University Dramatic Society in October 1921. It was described as "a sketch distinguished for its smart dialogue, but rather unconvincing".

Her 1931 play, The Rose, was performed in a testimonial to Steele Rudd, along with works by Vance Palmer, Louis Esson, Carrie Tennant and Basil Garstang.

Works

Poetry 

 
 1940–1942, 1944

Plays 

 The Rose (1931)
 Half Way to Paradise (1937)
 The Sea Chest (1938)

References

External links 

 Article on Nora McAuliffe by Bernice May (Zora Cross) in The Australian Woman's Mirror, 7 August 1928, p.10

Year of birth unknown
Year of death unknown
New Zealand women journalists
New Zealand women poets
Writers from Dunedin
Australian women journalists
Australian women poets
People educated at Trinity Catholic College, Dunedin